Paul Stahl (May 18, 1940 – April 20, 2016) was a Canadian sprint canoer who competed in the mid-1960s. At the 1964 Summer Olympics in Tokyo, he finished seventh in the C-1 1000 m event. He won many North American and Canadian Championships in Single and War Canoe.

References
Paul Stahl's profile at Sports Reference.com
Paul Stahl's obituary

1940 births
2016 deaths
Canadian male canoeists
Canoeists at the 1964 Summer Olympics
Olympic canoeists of Canada